Hithe may refer to:
 Hithe, Kenya
 Hythe